Emydura gunaleni is a species of Australasian short-necked turtle that is endemic to New Guinea. The specific epithet gunaleni honours Danny Gunalen, who was instrumental in recognising the distinctive nature of the species and in procuring specimens.

Distribution
The species occurs in Western New Guinea. The type locality is the Kais River in South Sorong Regency.

References

 
gunaleni
Turtles of New Guinea
Reptiles of Western New Guinea
Reptiles described in 2019